The 2013–14 Swazi Premier League season was the 2013–14 season of the top level of  football competition in Swaziland. It concluded on 10 May 2014.

Standings

References

Football leagues in Eswatini
Premier League
Premier League
Swaziland